Marcia Rodd is an American actress. She made her film debut playing a leading role in the 1971 film Little Murders, and later had supporting roles in films and television series. She appeared in several Broadway productions, earning a 1973 Tony Award® nomination for Best Actress in a Musical for Shelter.

Early years
The daughter of an oil company executive, Rodd was born in Lyons, Kansas, the daughter of Rosetta (née Thran) and Charles C. Rodd. For most of her youth, Rodd and her family lived in Tulsa. They moved to Wichita in time for her to attend East High School for her senior year. She also worked part-time at a store. She studied drama at Northwestern University. In the 1950s, she moved to New York City and performed onstage.

Career 
Rodd spent the 1960s and 1970s appearing on and off Broadway. She made her Broadway debut in late 1964 as a replacement in the musical Oh, What a Lovely War, assuming the roles placed by Linda Loftis. In 1966, she appeared as a replacement in the off-Broadway musical The Mad Show, and replaced Marian Mercer as Olivia in Your Own Thing, a musical adaptation of Shakespeare's Twelfth Night, one week after it opened off-Broadway in January 1968. She appeared in Norman Krasna's short-lived Broadway comedy Love in E Flat in 1967. From December 1969 to March 1971, Rodd performed in Neil Simon's The Last of the Red Hot Lovers on Broadway opposite Linda Lavin, Doris Roberts, and James Coco. Her portrayal of 'Maud' in the Broadway musical Shelter garnered her a Tony Award®  nomination for Best Actress in a Musical. in 1973.

In 1971, she appeared in the film T.R. Baskin with Candice Bergen, and the black comedy Little Murders opposite Elliott Gould. Her other film credits included Handle with Care (1977) and Last Embrace (1979).

During the 1970s, she appeared in several made-for-television productions, and continued making appearances on television shows through the next three decades. One of these appearances was in the episode of All in the Family that served as the pilot for the series Maude in the role of Maude's daughter Carol Traynor, who was eventually played by Adrienne Barbeau in the series. She had also played another character on a previous All in the Family episode, "Mike's Mysterious Son", earlier that same season.  Other guest appearances on television included M*A*S*H, Match Game '76, Murder, She Wrote, and a recurring role as Stanley Riverside's wife on Trapper John, M.D.

In 1978 she starred as the ingenue Cynthia Carter in the short-lived stage musical Barbary Coast.

Rodd portrayed Felicia in the TV series 13 Queens Boulevard in 1979.

She returned to Broadway in the mid-1980s, as a replacement for the role of Clara in Herb Gardner's I'm Not Rappaport. In 1989 and 1994, she starred in two separate national tours of Fiddler on the Roof, as Golde opposite both Theodore Bikel and Topol as Tevye, respectively.

She also appeared in a 2003 episode of the television series Without a Trace, the 2012 short film Parallax, and the long-running soap opera The Young and the Restless.

Filmography

Film

Television

References

External links

American film actresses
American stage actresses
American television actresses
Actresses from Kansas
Living people
People from Lyons, Kansas
Northwestern University School of Communication alumni
20th-century American actresses
21st-century American actresses
Year of birth missing (living people)
|}